"The Dead" is the seventh episode of the third season of the anthology television series American Horror Story, which premiered on November 20, 2013, on the cable network FX. This episode is rated TV-MA (LSV).

In this episode, Queenie (Gabourey Sidibe) questions her place in the Coven; Fiona (Jessica Lange) takes advantage of a love affair with the Axeman (Danny Huston); and Cordelia (Sarah Paulson) makes a fateful decision about her mother. Angela Bassett, Gabourey Sidibe, and Danny Huston guest star as Marie Laveau, Queenie, and the Axeman, respectively.

Plot

Madison has been experimenting with potions to improve her resurrected appearance, her insensitivity to physical pain and an insatiable hunger. After trying a bunch of potions, she finds one that makes her look normal and then proceeds to eat all the food in the house as she feels an emptiness inside. After a drunken phone call from a heavily armed Hank, Cordelia searches blindly through the hallways and stumbles into Madison. A vision shows Cordelia how Fiona killed Madison.

Delphine and Queenie go to a fast food drive-thru. Delphine and tells Queenie that Queenie's efforts to bond with the other witches will fail due to her race. Queenie decides to pay a visit to Marie, who knows all about her. Over gumbo, Marie tells Queenie about Delphine and offers Queenie amnesty in exchange for Delphine. Queenie leaves, considering the offer.

The Axeman and Fiona enjoy a nightcap in an apartment that Fiona believes to be his. A primp in the mirror results in some hair falling out from Fiona's head. The Axeman seduces her into staying for some jazz-inspired sex.

Zoe starts trying to rehabilitate Kyle to functional humanity. Zoe leaves Madison and Kyle alone and Madison describes their shared afterlife experiences. They conspire to kill Fiona. Zoe re-enters her room to find Kyle having rough sex with Madison.

Zoe casts a spell to restore Spalding's tongue and interrogates him. She forces him to admit that Fiona killed Madison and stabs him to death for his betrayal of the coven and covering up Madison's death. After washing off the blood in the shower, she runs into Madison and tries to act nonchalant about witnessing Madison and Kyle's sexual encounter. While unwilling to give him up, Madison is sympathetic to Zoe's feelings and proposes that they share Kyle; she then leads Zoe to Kyle, and they have a threesome.

Reception
"The Dead" received a 2.2 18–49 ratings share and was watched by 3.995 million viewers, winning the night for cable.

"The Dead" received critical acclaim. Rotten Tomatoes reports a 100% approval rating, based on 15 reviews. The critical consensus reads, ""The Dead" throws outlandish preposterousness at the wall, not the oddest of which is monstrous Franken-sex, and it sticks – with extra stickiness." Emily VanDerWerff of The A.V. Club gave the episode a B rating, saying, "There were some genuinely eerie and even touching moments throughout the hour, especially when it came to the show's growing cast of not-so-shambling undead residents, as well as the way it increasingly is drawing up battle lines between all of the characters for the witch wars to come." Matt Fowler from IGN gave the episode a 7.7/10 rating, saying, "Coven gave us a kinder, more 'giving' Madison this week on a busy episode that may have been too cluttered."

References

External links

 
 "The Dead" at TV Guide.com

2013 American television episodes
American Horror Story: Coven episodes
Television episodes written by Brad Falchuk